Hu Chien-chung (1 February 1904 – 26 September 1993) was a Chinese newspaper editor and politician.

Life and career
Born Hu Ching-ya in Nanking, he was also known as Chen-ou, by the courtesy name Hsu-jou, or the pen name Hung-tzu. After graduating from the Department of English at Fudan University, Hu taught at a middle school in Kiangsu, then at his alma mater before accepting a lectureship in journalism at the Central School of Governance. The newspaper was renamed the Southeastern Daily in 1934. After the Second Sino-Japanese War broke out, Hu moved the newspaper to Kinhwa, and later established editions of the Southeastern Daily in Yenping and Lishui. From 1943 to 1946, he worked concurrently for the Central Daily News and the Southeastern Daily. Hu resigned his position at the Central Daily News to establish the Shanghai edition of the Southeastern Daily and the affiliated Southeastern Journalism Company, which focused on the Hangchow and Shanghai editions of the newspaper.

He moved to Taiwan with the Chiang Kai-shek-led government of the Republic of China. Outside of his legislative service, Hu was elected to several terms as a member of the Central Standing Committee of the Kuomintang during the 1960s, led the Central Motion Picture Corporation, and chaired the 1965 Chia Hsin Awards committee.

References

1904 births
1993 deaths
Chinese Civil War refugees
Taiwanese people from Jiangsu
Republic of China politicians from Jiangsu
Chinese newspaper editors
Members of the 1st Legislative Yuan
Members of the 1st Legislative Yuan in Taiwan
Kuomintang Members of the Legislative Yuan in Taiwan
Party List Members of the Legislative Yuan
Politicians from Nanjing
Chinese schoolteachers
Fudan University alumni
Academic staff of Fudan University
Academic staff of the National Chengchi University